Another Bullshit Night in Suck City is a memoir by playwright and poet Nick Flynn, describing Flynn's reunion with his estranged father, Jonathan, an alcoholic resident of the homeless shelter where Nick was a social worker in the late 1980s. The title refers to Jonathan's description of homeless life in Boston. It was published by W. W. Norton in September 2004.

Reception
Publishers Weekly described it as "biting", and noted that "(a)lthough (the book is) depressing", it is not "hopeless", because Flynn — unlike his father — was able to "write well". At the Guardian, Christopher Priest commended Flynn for the book's "impressionistic, fragmentary" style that "actually seems to capture the banal, confusing mind of a homeless drunkard", but said that despite Flynn's skill, its subject "remains banal, depressing and sordid".

The memoir earned Flynn a 2004 award from PEN International, was shortlisted for the Prix Femina, and has been translated into fifteen languages.

Film adaptation
In 2007, Twentieth Century Fox acquired the rights to produce a movie adaptation of the memoir,  Filming began in the summer of 2010 with Paul Weitz as director, and starring Robert De Niro as Jonathan and Paul Dano as Nick. The film, titled Being Flynn, was released on March 2, 2012.

In 2013,  W.W. Norton published "The Reenactments", Flynn's memoir about his experiences during the making of the film adaptation.

In popular culture
In the 2014 movie 5 to 7, the main character is seen buying a copy of Another Bullshit Night in Suck City at the bookshop.

References

External links
 Being Flynn, film trailer

2004 non-fiction books
American memoirs
Memoirs adapted into films
W. W. Norton & Company books